Five Mile Lake Water Aerodrome  is a former airport. It was located on Five Mile Lake, Ontario, Canada.

References

Defunct seaplane bases in Ontario